Since 1998, Trey Anastasio, best known from Phish, has toured and recorded with several backing musicians, including several side-projects organized and led by the guitarist and composer.  Fans commonly referred to them as Trey Anastasio Band, or TAB for short.  In spring 2005, after the break up of Phish the previous fall, Trey formed 70 Volt Parade. This moniker only lasted a short time, as he began using the name Trey Anastasio Band for this group the following year. In 2008, he toured with members of the older band as "Classic TAB", and then two years later, he began again using the name Trey Anastasio Band for this group. Through its history, Trey Anastasio's band has gone through many different configurations, ranging from a trio to a dectet.

The beginning
Trey's band had it roots in his brother-in-law's Vermont nightclub, Higher Ground.  On April 17, 1998, for the second show in the club's existence, Anastasio put together a band of local Vermont musicians for a one time performance under  the name Eight Foot Fluorescent Tubes. Among the five musicians onstage with Trey that evening were drummer Russ Lawton and bassist Tony Markellis. They debuted material that night that became part of the repertoire of both Phish and Anastasio's solo career.

The trio
Less than a year later, on February 15, 1999, Trey performed a benefit show at Higher Ground for a local arts charity with Lawton and Markellis.  Later that spring, the trio (as they are referred to on Anastasio's website) went on a national tour of clubs and theatres.  Most of the shows sold out, which featured a solo acoustic set by Anastasio and an electric set by The Trio.  They debuted more new songs, many of them appearing on Phish’s 2000 album, Farmhouse. Absent from the tour were any songs from Trey's first solo album, One Man's Trash, which was released in late 1998.

In Spring 2018, Trey toured again as a trio alongside Lawton and Markellis. The tour began on April 17, 2018—on the 20 year anniversary of Trey's first solo show, Eight Foot Fluorescent Tubes.

The sextet
After Phish went on hiatus in 2000, Anastasio took his project on the road and added a horn section.  Saxophonist Dave Grippo, a Burlington music teacher with a long history with Phish, trombone player Andy Moroz, and trumpet player Jennifer Hartswick joined Trey's band for this and all future tours.  These shows, and all to follow had two full sets with the band, and no solo acoustic set.

The octet
Later in 2001, with Phish still inactive, Anastasio booked a summer tour of large amphitheatres where Phish had regularly performed in recent years. This tour also included some venues that Phish hadn't played in years like Red Rocks in Colorado and Jones Beach in Long Island, New York. Two more members were added to Trey's band, tenor saxophonist/flautist Russell Remington and keyboardist Ray Paczkowski

The dectet
2002 saw the release of Trey's self-titled second album, and a summer tour to support it. This tour of amphitheatres was significantly smaller than the 2001 tour.  At this time, Anastasio added the final two members to the group, Brazilian percussionist Cyro Baptista and the multitalented Peter Apfelbaum.

Late in the summer of 2002, Phish announced their reunion, with their first show slated for New Year's Eve.  During the fall of 2002, with Anastasio still promoting his second solo album, he took his dectet for a tour of smaller venues.

In 2003, with a Phish summer tour planned, Trey scaled back his touring. He played a brief tour that spring, before spending his first summer in three years with Phish.

In 2004, Trey played some random dates. He performed at the Easter jam at Higher Ground, with the other members of Phish. He then played a surprise birthday party in Stowe, Vermont.

In May, with Phish tour dates already booked, Anastasio made the announcement that Phish would be breaking up and the upcoming summer tour would be their last.

In June, days before Phish would start its final tour, Trey performed at the Bonnaroo music festival.

On September 18, 2004, about a month after Phish's final performance, Trey would play his final performance to date with his horn-based band at the Austin City Limits Music Festival.

Subsequent solo bands
In the spring of 2005, Anastasio introduced a new backing band, 70 Volt Parade, featuring Paczkowski, Skeeto Valdez on drums, Peter Chwazik on bass, and Les Hall on guitar and keyboards. After only a few months, Anastasio replaced Chwazik with Tony Hall of Ivan Neville's Dumpstaphunk, and added Hartswick and Christina Durfee on backing vocals.  Anastasio then replaced Valdez with Raymond Weber.  Russell Remington also rejoined Anastasio shortly thereafter.  In 2006, Les Hall left the band, and it was renamed Trey Anastasio Band. Jeff Cressman and Jeff Sipe, who replaced Weber, toured with the project in 2006 and 2007.

Fall 2008 tour to 2020
In October 2008, Anastasio set out on a short tour billed as "Trey Anastasio & Classic TAB".  This quartet featured Anastasio on guitar, Tony Markellis on bass, Russ Lawton on drums, and Ray Paczkowski on keyboards. In 2010, Jennifer Hartswick officially rejoined the project, renamed Trey Anastasio Band, and has remained with the group ever since. At the same, time Anastasio welcomed back Russ Remington  and introduced Natalie Cressman, 
, whose father Jeff was a member of TAB in 2006 and 2007. Remington left TAB at the end of 2011 and was replaced by James Casey in 2012. Cressman remains in TAB to this day.

2021 and onward

In April 2021, Markellis died. Later, bassist Dezron Douglas was announced as the band’s new bass player. In September 2021, James Casey announced he had cancer and would not be taking part in the fall tour. Cochemea Gastelum filled James’ role in the group during the tour. During TAB's 2021 fall tour, both Hartswick and Lawton tested positive for COVID-19, leaving a stripped-down lineup with no horn section and Phish drummer Jon Fishman taking over for Lawton. In 2022, the band resumed touring with its standard lineup including Casey, Lawton and the horn section.

References

External links
Trey Anastasio official website
Phish official website
Natalie Cressman discusses what it's like to be so young and touring with Trey with Ira Haberman of The Sound Podcast during a feature interview

Lists of musicians